Advaita Kalanala  (Sanskrit:अद्वैत कालानल);, is a Sanskrit work on Dvaita philosophy written by Narayanacharya. It is a refutation work for the theological controversies provoked by Appayya Dikshita's on Madhva Siddhanta. It runs to 8000 granthas (stanzas).

Overview
According to Indologist B. N. Krishnamurti Sharma, The first chapter of the work deals with certain initial defects of Advaita metaphysics such as its disrupt of Pramanas and non-acceptance of any fundamental criteria of validity and truth determination upon which the conduct of practical life is based; it's the arbitrary distinction of reality into absolute, phenomenal and apparent and the mutual divergence of views among the authorities of the school, on many crucial points of doctrine and detail.
 
According to B.N.K. Sharma, the second chapter is a spirited reply to certain miscellaneous allegations of Appayya against the trustworthiness of and acceptability of Madhva's interpretation of the Sutras such as, (i) his indifference to and misrepresentation of the principles of Vedic interpretation and Mīmāṃsā exegesis; (ii) his fondness for untraceable Srutis and Smritis in support of his peculiar interpretations; and (iii) his glaring metrical flaws and lapses from correct grammar and usage of words. Nārāyaṇā refutes these charges with the solid array of facts and figures, indicating the correctness of Madhva's interpretations and their loyalty to genuine traditions of Vedic interpretations. The authenticity of the metrical forms and soundness of the grammatical forms impugned by the critic are upheld.

B.N.K. Sharma says, the next two chapters are devoted to the justification of Purvapaksha of the opening Adhikarana of Brahma Sutras as developed by Madhva and his commentators against the refutations attempted by the critic. The last chapter deals with the criticisms on the 2nd, 3rd, 4th, and 5th Adhikaranas of Brahma Sutras and is wound up with a general review of criticisms on the rest of the Brahma Sutra Bhashya.

Sharma says, it may be said that Narayanacharya has successfully repelled the criticisms of Appayya and shown them to be quite shallow and sentimental and based on irrelevant considerations. He has tried to put up an unexpurgated case for the soundness and acceptability of Madhva's interpretations of the Sutras. His intimate knowledge of several branches of learning and familiarity with the literature of Advaita and mutual differences of views among its exponents enable him to corner the critic at inconvenient angles and show that the criticisms leveled against Madhva's interpretations have no more than a "nuisance value"  and are powerless to cause any permanent damage to their structure.

Legacy
Indologist B. N. K. Sharma writes, "The Advaitakālānala is a scathing criticism of the Madhvamatamukhamardana of Appayya. The carping criticisms and bitter personal attacks of the Dikshita are vigorously returned by Narayana. He loses no opportunity to pay the critic in his coin and with compound interest. The tone of the work is thus retaliatory and bitingly sarcastic". American historian Anthony Grafton and classicist  Glenn W. Most considered the work Advaitakālānala along with the Abhinava-Gada  of Satyanatha Tirtha as a new mace which broke the heads of non-dualists like Appayya Dikshita.

References

Bibliography
 

Dvaita Vedanta
Philosophical literature
Sanskrit texts